The Cummins L-series engine is a straight-six diesel engine designed and produced by Cummins. It displaces , and began production in 1982 as the L10 at the Jamestown Engine Plant in Jamestown, New York. After lengthening its stroke from 136 to 147mm, its displacement was enlarged to 10.8 litres and the engine renamed ISM 11, later M11.

The ISL 9 and current L9 engines are not related to the L10 engine, but instead based on the smaller C-series platform with the 135mm stroke of the C8.3 enlarged to 144.5mm, together with 4 valves per cylinder, giving it 8.9 litres displacement.

 The L10 displaced , and was available in either a vertical form, for upright use in trucks and buses, or horizontal form, for underfloor use in buses and trains. The L10 was Cummins's first competitive offering in the British bus market, as their earlier production had been too large and heavy. However, it had a troublesome introduction to the British market, with high oil consumption and sealing problems.

By 1994, it had been developed into the M11, and in 1998, Cummins ceased production of the old L-series engine. After the original L10 evolved into the M11 engine, the new ISL9 engine was introduced to operate in this market segment, yet with a better power-to-weight ratio, by enlarging the piston stroke of the older C8.3 engine. The Cummins L10 also has a sister engine which runs on compressed natural gas (CNG). The engine was introduced in 1992 as the L10G before being replaced by the L Gas Plus in 2001 until it became the ISL G in collaboration with Westport Innovations in 2008, now based on the C-series engine architecture. The ISL engines were manufactured at plants in Rocky Mount, North Carolina and Darlington, England.

In 2016 onwards, the ISL9 was simplified to L9, though physically it shares no resemblance to the old L10 engine: The current L9 engine is a stroked version of the C8.3 engine platform, while the current M11 engine is a stroked version of the original L10 engine platform.

Models

Popular power ratings
Diesel-powered urban bus
 at 1300 rpm,  electronically governed at 2200 rpm
 at 1300 rpm,  electronically governed at 2200 rpm
 at 1300 rpm,  electronically governed at 2200 rpm

Natural gas-powered urban bus (L Gas Plus, ISL G, ISL G NZ, L9N)
 at 1300 rpm,  electronically governed at 2000 rpm
 at 1300 rpm,  electronically governed at 2100 rpm
 at 1300 rpm,  electronically governed at 2000 rpm

Firetruck/motorhome/truck
 at 1300 rpm,  electronically governed at 2100 rpm
 at 1300 rpm,  electronically governed at 2100 rpm
 at 1300 rpm,  electronically governed at 2200 rpm

References

External links
Cummins website
Cummins Westport (CNG) website

Cummins diesel engines
Diesel engines by model
Straight-six engines